Borneo is the third-largest island in the world and the largest in Asia. At the geographic centre of Maritime Southeast Asia, in relation to major Indonesian islands, it is located north of Java, west of Sulawesi, and east of Sumatra.

The island is politically divided among three countries: Malaysia and Brunei in the north, and Indonesia to the south. Approximately 73% of the island is Indonesian territory. In the north, the East Malaysian states of Sabah and Sarawak make up about 26% of the island. The population in Borneo is 23,053,723 (2020 national censuses). Additionally, the Malaysian federal territory of Labuan is situated on a small island just off the coast of Borneo. The sovereign state of Brunei, located on the north coast, comprises about 1% of Borneo's land area. A little more than half of the island is in the Northern Hemisphere, including Brunei and the Malaysian portion, while the Indonesian portion spans the Northern and Southern hemispheres.

Etymology 
The island is known by many names. Internationally it is known as Borneo, derived from European contact with the Brunei kingdom in the 16th century during the Age of Exploration. On a map from around 1601, Brunei city is referred to as Borneo, and the whole island is also labelled Borneo. The name Borneo may derive from the Sanskrit word , meaning either "water" or Varuna, the Hindu god of rain.

The local population called it Klemantan or Kalimantan, which was derived from the Sanskrit word Kalamanthana, meaning "burning weather" possibly to describe its hot and humid tropical weather. Indonesian historian Slamet Muljana suggests that the name Kalamanthana was derived from Sanskrit terms kala (time or season) and manthana (churning, kindling or creating fire by friction), which possibly describes the heat of the weather.

In earlier times, the island was known by other names. In 977, Chinese records began to use the term Bo-ni to refer to Borneo. In 1225, it was also mentioned by the Chinese official Chau Ju-Kua (趙汝适). The Javanese manuscript Nagarakretagama, written by Majapahit court poet Mpu Prapanca in 1365, mentioned the island as Nusa Tanjungnagara, which means the island of the Tanjungpura Kingdom. Nevertheless, the same manuscript also mentioned Barune (Brunei) and other polities on the island.

Geography

Geology 

Borneo was formed through Mesozoic accretion of microcontinental fragments, ophiolite terranes and island arc crust onto a Paleozoic continental core. At the beginning of the Cenozoic Borneo formed a promontory of Sundaland which partly separated from Asian mainland by the proto-South China Sea. The oceanic part of the proto-South China Sea was subducted during the Paleogene period and a large accretionary complex formed along the northwestern of the island of Borneo. In the early Miocene uplift of the accretionary complex occurred as a result of underthrusting of thinned continental crust in northwest. The uplift may have also resulted from shortening due to the counter-clockwise rotation of Borneo between 20 and 10 mega-annum (Ma) as a consequence of Australia-Southeast Asia collision. Large volumes of sediment were shed into basins, which scattered offshore to the west, north and east of Borneo as well into a Neogene basin which is currently exposed in large areas of eastern and southern Sabah. In southeast Sabah, the Miocene to recent island arc terranes of the Sulu Archipelago extend onshore into Borneo with the older volcanic arc was the result of southeast dipping subduction while the younger volcanics are likely resulted from northwest dipping subduction the Celebes Sea.

Before sea levels rose at the end of the last ice age, Borneo was part of the mainland of Asia, forming, with Java and Sumatra, the upland regions of a peninsula that extended east from present day Indochina. The South China Sea and Gulf of Thailand now submerge the former low-lying areas of the peninsula. Deeper waters separating Borneo from neighbouring Sulawesi prevented a land connection to that island, creating the divide known as Wallace's Line between Asian and Australia-New Guinea biological regions. The island today is surrounded by the South China Sea to the north and northwest, the Sulu Sea to the northeast, the Celebes Sea and the Makassar Strait to the east, and the Java Sea and Karimata Strait to the south. To the west of Borneo are the Malay Peninsula and Sumatra. To the south and east are islands of Indonesia: Java and Sulawesi, respectively. To the northeast are the Philippine Islands.

Borneo has significant cave systems. The Gomantong Caves in Sabah has been dubbed as the "Cockroach Cave" due to the presence of millions of cockroaches inside the cave. The Gunung Mulu National Park in Sarawak and Sangkulirang-Mangkalihat Karst in East Kalimantan which particularly a karst areas contains thousands of smaller caves.

Ecology 

The Borneo rainforest is estimated to be around 140 million years old, making it one of the oldest rainforests in the world. It is the centre of the evolution and distribution of many endemic species of plants and animals, and the rainforest is one of the few remaining natural habitats for the endangered Bornean orangutan. It is an important refuge for many endemic forest species, including the Borneo elephant, the eastern Sumatran rhinoceros, the Bornean clouded leopard, the Bornean rock frog, the hose's palm civet and the dayak fruit bat.

Peat swamp forests occupy the entire coastline of Borneo. The soil of the peat swamp is comparatively infertile, while it is known to be the home of various bird species such as the hook-billed bulbul, helmeted hornbill and rhinoceros hornbill. There are about 15,000 species of flowering plants with 3,000 species of trees (267 species are dipterocarps), 221 species of terrestrial mammals and 420 species of resident birds in Borneo. There are about 440 freshwater fish species in Borneo (about the same as Sumatra and Java combined). The Borneo river shark is known only from the Kinabatangan River. In 2010, the World Wide Fund for Nature (WWF) stated that 123 species have been discovered in Borneo since the "Heart of Borneo" agreement was signed in 2007.

The WWF has classified the island into seven distinct ecoregions. Most are lowland regions:
 Borneo peat swamp forests
 Kerangas or Sundaland heath forests
 Southwest Borneo freshwater swamp forests are found in the island's western and southern lowlands
 Sunda Shelf mangroves
 The Borneo montane rain forests lie in the central highlands of the island, above the  elevation.
The highest elevations of Mount Kinabalu are home to the Kinabalu montane alpine meadows, a subalpine and alpine shrubland notable for its numerous endemic species, including many orchids.

According to analysis of data from Global Forest Watch, the Indonesian portion of Borneo lost 10.7 million hectares of tree cover between 2002 and 2019, of which 4 million hectares was primary forest, compared with Malaysian Borneo's 4.4 million hectares of tree cover loss and 1.9 million hectares of primary forest cover loss. As of 2020, Indonesian Borneo accounts for 72% of the island's tree cover, Malaysian Borneo 27%, and Brunei 1%. Primary forest in Indonesia accounts for 44% of Borneo's overall tree cover.

Conservation issues 

The island historically had extensive rainforest cover, but the area was reduced due to heavy logging by the Indonesian and Malaysian wood industry, especially with the large demands of raw materials from industrial countries along with the conversion of forest lands for large-scale agricultural purposes. Half of the annual global tropical timber acquisition comes from Borneo. Palm oil plantations have been widely developed and are rapidly encroaching on the last remnants of primary rainforest. Forest fires since 1997, started by the locals to clear the forests for plantations were exacerbated by an exceptionally dry El Niño season, worsening the annual shrinkage of the rainforest. During these fires, hotspots were visible on satellite images and the resulting haze frequently affected Brunei, Indonesia and Malaysia. The haze could also reach southern Thailand, Cambodia, Vietnam and the Philippines as evidenced on the 2015 Southeast Asian haze.

A 2018 study found that Bornean orangutans declined by 148,500 individuals from 1999 to 2015.

Topography

List of highest peaks in Borneo by elevation.

 Mount Kinabalu 
 Mount Trusmadi 
 Raya Hill 
 Muruk Miau 
 Mount Wakid 
 Monkobo Hill 
 Mount Lotung 
 Mount Magdalena 
 Talibu Hill

River systems

List of longest river in Borneo by length.

 Kapuas River 
Barito River 
 Mahakam River  
 Rajang River 
Kahayan River 
 Mendawai River 
 Kayan River 
 Kinabatangan River 
 Baram River 
 Sembakung River 
 Sesayap River 
 Pawan River

History

Early history 

In November 2018, scientists reported the discovery of the oldest known figurative art painting, over 40,000 (perhaps as old as 52,000) years old, of an unknown animal, in the cave of Lubang Jeriji Saléh on the island of Borneo.

According to ancient Chinese (977), Indian and Japanese manuscripts, western coastal cities of Borneo had become trading ports by the first millennium AD. In Chinese manuscripts, gold, camphor, tortoise shells, hornbill ivory, rhinoceros horn, crane crest, beeswax, lakawood (a scented heartwood and root wood of a thick liana, Dalbergia parviflora), dragon's blood, rattan, edible bird's nests and various spices were described as among the most valuable items from Borneo. The Indians named Borneo Suvarnabhumi (the land of gold) and also Karpuradvipa (Camphor Island). The Javanese named Borneo Puradvipa, or Diamond Island. Archaeological findings in the Sarawak river delta reveal that the area was a thriving centre of trade between India and China from the 6th century until about 1300.

Stone pillars bearing inscriptions in the Pallava script, found in Kutai along the Mahakam River in East Kalimantan and dating to around the second half of the 4th century, constitute some of the oldest evidence of Hindu influence in Southeast Asia. By the 14th century, Borneo became a vassal state of Majapahit (in present-day Indonesia), later changing its allegiance to the Ming dynasty of China. Pre-Islamic Sulu, then known locally as Lupah Sug, stretched from Palawan and the Sulu archipelago at the Philippines; to Sabah, Eastern, and Northern Kalimantan in Borneo. The Sulu empire rose as a rebellion and reaction against former Majapahit Imperialism against Sulu which Majapahit briefly occupied. The religion of Islam entered the island in the 10th century, following the arrival of Muslim traders who later converted many indigenous peoples in the coastal areas.

The Sultanate of Brunei declared independence from Majapahit following the death of the Majapahit emperor in the mid-14th century. During its golden age under Bolkiah from the 15th to the 17th century, the Bruneian sultanate ruled almost the entire coastal area of Borneo (lending its name to the island due to its influence in the region) and several islands in the Philippines. During the 1450s, Shari'ful Hashem Syed Abu Bakr, an Arab born in Johor, arrived in Sulu from Malacca. In 1457, he founded the Sultanate of Sulu; he titled himself as "Paduka Maulana Mahasari Sharif Sultan Hashem Abu Bakr". Following its independence in 1578 from Brunei's influence, Sulu began to expand its thalassocracy to parts of the northern Borneo. Both the sultanates who ruled northern Borneo had traditionally engaged in trade with China by means of the frequently-arriving Chinese junks. Despite the thalassocracy of the sultanates, Borneo's interior region remained free from the rule of any kingdoms.

British and Dutch control 

Since the fall of Malacca in 1511, Portuguese merchants traded regularly with Borneo, and especially with Brunei from 1530. Having visited Brunei's capital, the Portuguese described the place as surrounded by a stone wall. While Borneo was seen as rich, the Portuguese did not make any attempts to conquer it. The Spanish had sailed from Latin America and conquered the Brunei's provinces in the Philippines and incorporated it into the Mexico-Centered Viceroyalty of New Spain. The Spanish visit to Brunei led to the Castilian War in 1578. The English began to trade with Sambas of southern Borneo in 1609, while the Dutch only began their trade in 1644: to Banjar and Martapura, also in the southern Borneo. The Dutch tried to settle the island of Balambangan, north of Borneo, in the second half of the 18th century, but withdrew by 1797. In 1812, the sultan in southern Borneo ceded his forts to the English East India Company. The English, led by Stamford Raffles, then tried to establish an intervention in Sambas but failed. Although they managed to defeat the sultanate the next year and declared a blockade on all ports in Borneo except Brunei, Banjarmasin and Pontianak, the project was cancelled by the British governor-general Lord Minto in India as it was too expensive. At the beginning of British and Dutch exploration on the island, they described the island of Borneo as full of head hunters, with the indigenous in the interior practising cannibalism, and the waters around the island infested with pirates, especially between the north eastern Borneo and the southern Philippines. The Malay and Sea Dayak pirates preyed on maritime shipping in the waters between Singapore and Hong Kong from their haven in Borneo, along with the attacks by Illanuns of the Moro pirates from the southern Philippines, such as in the Battle off Mukah.

The Dutch began to intervene in the southern part of the island upon resuming contact in 1815, posting residents to Banjarmasin, Pontianak and Sambas and assistant-residents to Landak and Mampawa. The Sultanate of Brunei in 1842 granted large parts of land in Sarawak to the English adventurer James Brooke, as a reward for his help in quelling a local rebellion. Brooke established the Raj of Sarawak and was recognised as its rajah after paying a fee to the sultanate. He established a monarchy, and the Brooke dynasty (through his nephew and great-nephew) ruled Sarawak for 100 years; the leaders were known as the White Rajahs. Brooke also acquired the island of Labuan for Great Britain in 1846 through the Treaty of Labuan with the sultan of Brunei, Omar Ali Saifuddin II on 18 December 1846. The region of northern Borneo came under the administration of North Borneo Chartered Company following the acquisition of territory from the Sultanates of Brunei and Sulu by a German businessman and adventurer named Baron von Overbeck, before it was passed to the British Dent brothers (comprising Alfred Dent and Edward Dent). Further expansion by the British continued into the Borneo interior. This led the 26th sultan of Brunei, Hashim Jalilul Alam Aqamaddin to appeal the British to halt such efforts, and as a result a Treaty of Protection was signed in 1888, rendering Brunei a British protectorate.

Before the acquisition by the British, the Americans also managed to establish their temporary presence in northwestern Borneo after acquiring a parcel of land from the Sultanate of Brunei. A company known as American Trading Company of Borneo was formed by Joseph William Torrey, Thomas Bradley Harris and several Chinese investors, establishing a colony named "Ellena" in the Kimanis area. The colony failed and was abandoned, due to denials of financial backing, especially by the US government, and to diseases and riots among the workers. Before Torrey left, he managed to sell the land to the German businessman, Overbeck. Meanwhile, the Germans under William Frederick Schuck were awarded a parcel of land in northeastern Borneo of the Sandakan Bay from the Sultanate of Sulu where he conducted business and exported large quantities of arms, opium, textiles and tobacco to Sulu before the land was also passed to Overbeck by the sultanate.

Prior to the recognition of Spanish presence in the Philippine archipelago, a protocol known as the Madrid Protocol of 1885 was signed between the governments of the United Kingdom, Germany and Spain in Madrid to cement Spanish influence and recognise their sovereignty over the Sultanate of Sulu—in return for Spain's relinquishing its claim to the former possessions of the sultanate in northern Borneo. The British administration then established the first railway network in northern Borneo, known as the North Borneo Railway. During this time, the British sponsored a large number of Chinese workers to migrate to northern Borneo to work in European plantation and mines, and the Dutch followed suit to increase their economic production. By 1888, North Borneo, Sarawak and Brunei in northern Borneo had become British protectorate. The area in southern Borneo was made Dutch protectorate in 1891. The Dutch who already claimed the whole Borneo were asked by Britain to delimit their boundaries between the two colonial territories to avoid further conflicts. The British and Dutch governments had signed the Anglo-Dutch Treaty of 1824 to exchange trading ports in Malay Peninsula and Sumatra that were under their controls and assert spheres of influence. This resulted in indirectly establishing British- and Dutch-controlled areas in the north (Malay Peninsula) and south (Sumatra and Riau Islands) respectively.

In 1895, Marcus Samuel received a concession in the Kutei area of east Borneo, and based on oil seepages in the Mahakam River delta, Mark Abrahams struck oil in February 1897. This was the discovery of the Sanga Sanga Oil Field, a refinery was built in Balikpapan, and discovery of the Samboja Oil Field followed in 1909. In 1901, the Pamusian Oil Field was discovered on Tarakan, and the Bunyu Oil Field in 1929. Royal Dutch Shell discovered the Miri Oil Field in 1910, and the Seria oil field in 1929.

World War II 

During World War II, Japanese forces gained control and occupied most areas of Borneo from 1941 to 1945. In the first stage of the war, the British saw the Japanese advance to Borneo as motivated by political and territorial ambitions rather than economic factors. The occupation drove many people in the coastal towns to the interior, searching for food and escaping the Japanese. The Chinese residents in Borneo, especially with the Sino-Japanese War in Mainland China mostly resisted the Japanese occupation. Following the formation of resistance movements in northern Borneo such as the Jesselton Revolt, many innocent indigenous and Chinese people were executed by the Japanese for their alleged involvement.

In Kalimantan, the Japanese also killed many Malay intellectuals, executing all the Malay sultans of West Kalimantan in the Pontianak incidents, together with Chinese people who were already against the Japanese for suspecting them to be threats. Sultan Muhammad Ibrahim Shafi ud-din II of Sambas was executed in 1944. The sultanate was thereafter suspended and replaced by a Japanese council. The Japanese also set-up Pusat Tenaga Rakjat (PUTERA) in the Indonesian archipelago in 1943, although it was abolished the following year when it became too nationalistic. Some of the Indonesian nationalist like Sukarno and Hatta who had returned from Dutch exile began to co-operate with the Japanese. Shortly after his release, Sukarno became president of the Central Advisory Council, an advisory council for south Borneo, Celebes, and Lesser Sunda, set up in February 1945.

Since the fall of Singapore, the Japanese sent several thousand of British and Australian prisoners of war to camps in Borneo such as Batu Lintang camp. From the Sandakan camp site, only six of some 2,500 prisoners survived after they were forced to march in an event known as the Sandakan Death March. In addition, of the total of 17,488 Javanese labourers brought in by the Japanese during the occupation, only 1,500 survived mainly due to starvation, harsh working conditions and maltreatment. The Dayak and other indigenous people played a role in guerrilla warfare against the occupying forces, particularly in the Kapit Division. They temporarily revived headhunting of Japanese toward the end of the war, with Allied Z Special Unit provided assistance to them. Australia contributed significantly to the liberation of Borneo. The Australian Imperial Force was sent to Borneo to fight off the Japanese. Together with other Allies, the island was completely liberated in 1945.

Recent history 

In May 1945, officials in Tokyo suggested that whether northern Borneo should be included in the proposed new country of Indonesia should be separately determined based on the desires of its indigenous people and following the disposition of Malaya. Sukarno and Mohammad Yamin meanwhile continuously advocated for a Greater Indonesian republic. Towards the end of the war, Japan decided to give an early independence to a new proposed country of Indonesia on 17 July 1945, with an Independence Committee meeting scheduled for 19 August 1945. However, following the surrender of Japan to the Allied forces, the meeting was shelved. Sukarno and Hatta continued the plan by unilaterally declaring independence, although the Dutch tried to retake their colonial possession in Borneo. The southern part of the island achieved its independence through the Proclamation of Indonesian Independence on 17 August 1945. The southern part saw guerilla conflicts followed by Dutch blockade to cut supplies for nationalist within the region. While nationalist guerrillas supporting the inclusion of southern Borneo in the new Indonesian republic were active in Ketapang, and to lesser extent in Sambas where they rallied with the red-white flag which became the flag of Indonesia, most of the Chinese residents in southern Borneo expected to be liberated by Chinese Nationalist troops from mainland China and to integrate their districts as an overseas province of China. Meanwhile, Sarawak and Sabah in northern Borneo became separate British crown colonies in 1946.

In 1961, Prime Minister Tunku Abdul Rahman of the independent Federation of Malaya desired to unite Malaya, the British colonies of Sarawak, North Borneo, Singapore and the protectorate of Brunei under the proposed Federation of Malaysia. The idea was heavily opposed by the governments in both Indonesia and the Philippines as well from communist sympathisers and nationalists in Borneo. Sukarno, as the president of the new republic, perceiving the British trying to maintain their presence in northern Borneo and the Malay Peninsula, decided to launch a military infiltration, later known as the confrontation, from 1962 to 1969. As a response to the growing opposition, the British deployed their armed forces to guard their colonies against Indonesian and communist revolts, which was also participated by Australia and New Zealand.

The Philippines opposed the newly proposed federation, claiming the eastern part of North Borneo (today the Malaysian state of Sabah) as part of its territory as a former possession of the Sultanate of Sulu. The Philippine government mostly based their claim on the Sultanate of Sulu's cession agreement with the British North Borneo Company, as by now the sultanate had come under the jurisdiction of the Philippine republican administration, which therefore should inherit the Sulu former territories. The Philippine government also claimed that the heirs of the sultanate had ceded all their territorial rights to the republic.

The Sultanate of Brunei at the first welcomed the proposal of a new larger federation. Meanwhile, the Brunei People's Party led by A.M. Azahari desired to reunify Brunei, Sarawak and North Borneo into one federation known as the North Borneo Federation, where the sultan of Brunei would be the head of state for the federation—though Azahari had his own intention to abolish the Brunei monarchy, to make Brunei more democratic, and to integrate the territory and other former British colonies in Borneo into Indonesia, with the support from the latter government. This directly led to the Brunei Revolt, which thwarted Azahari's attempt and forced him to escape to Indonesia. Brunei withdrew from being part of the new Federation of Malaysia due to some disagreements on other issues while political leaders in Sarawak and North Borneo continued to favour inclusion in a larger federation.

With the continuous opposition from Indonesia and the Philippines, the Cobbold Commission was established to discover the feeling of the native populations in northern Borneo; it found the people greatly in favour of federation, with various stipulations. The federation was successfully achieved with the inclusion of northern Borneo through the Malaysia Agreement on 16 September 1963. To this day, the area in northern Borneo is still subjected to attacks by Moro pirates since the 18th century and militant from groups such as Abu Sayyaf since 2000 in the frequent cross border attacks. During the administration of Philippine president Ferdinand Marcos, Marcos made some attempts to destabilise the state of Sabah, although his plan failed and resulted in the Jabidah massacre and later the insurgency in the southern Philippines.

In August 2019, Indonesian president Joko Widodo announced a plan to move the capital of Indonesia from Jakarta to a newly established location in the East Kalimantan province in Borneo.

Demographics 
The demonym for Borneo is Bornean.

Most of the population lives in coastal cities, although the hinterland has small towns and villages along the rivers.

Religion

Administration 

The island of Borneo is divided administratively by three countries.
 The independent sultanate of Brunei (main part and eastern exclave of Temburong)
 The Indonesian provinces of East, South, West, North and Central Kalimantan, in Kalimantan
 The East Malaysian states of Sabah and Sarawak, as well as the Federal Territory of Labuan (on offshore islands nearby)

Economy 
Borneo's economy depends mainly on agriculture, logging and mining, oil and gas, and ecotourism. Brunei's economy is highly dependent on the oil and gas production sector, and the country has become one of the largest oil producers in Southeast Asia. The Malaysian states of Sabah and Sarawak are both top exporters of timber. Sabah is also known as the agricultural producer of rubber, cacao, and vegetables, and for its fisheries, while Sabah, Sarawak and Labuan export liquefied natural gas (LNG) and petroleum. The Indonesian provinces of Kalimantan are mostly dependent on mining sectors despite also being involved in logging and oil and gas explorations.

See also 

 Hikayat Banjar
 Kutai basin
 List of islands of Indonesia
 List of islands of Malaysia
 Maphilindo
 List of bats of Borneo

Notes

References

Further reading

External links 
 
 
 Environmental Profile of Borneo – Background on Borneo, including natural and social history, deforestation statistics, and conservation news.

 
Greater Sunda Islands
International islands
Islands of Brunei
Islands of Malaysia
Maritime Southeast Asia